Bertha Julia Aadnesen Reeder Richards ( Stone; October 28, 1892 – December 26, 1982) was the fifth general president of the Young Women's Mutual Improvement Association of the Church of Jesus Christ of Latter-day Saints (LDS Church) from 1948 to 1961.

Biography
Bertha Julia Stone was born on October 28, 1892 in Ogden, Utah Territory to Frederick Napper Stone and Bertha Julia.  She attended Weber Academy after high school and married Christopher Aadnesen in 1912. The couple had two children. Christopher was killed in a hunting accident in 1930.

In 1934, Bertha married William Henry Reeder, Jr., a municipal judge who was a widower with one son. In 1941, William was called as the president of the New England States Mission of the church; the Reeders lived as church missionaries for nearly seven years in Cambridge, Massachusetts.

In April 1948, less than a year after returning to Ogden, Bertha Reeder succeeded Lucy Grant Cannon as the general president of the Young Women's Mutual Improvement Association.   One of her counselors was Frances Larue Carr Longden.  In March 1961, William Reeder died, and in September that year Bertha was released and was succeeded as Young Women president by Florence S. Jacobsen. During her tenure, the age groups in the Young Women organization were realigned to their current configuration and the "Gleaners" were renamed the "Laurels".

In 1964, Bertha married I.L. (Lee) Richards, a friend she had known for many years. Lee died in 1981, after which Bertha moved to Pocatello, Idaho to be near her daughter. She died in Pocatello, aged 90. Her funeral was held in Ogden.

References
Janet Peterson and LaRene Gaunt (1993). Keepers of the Flame: General Presidents of the Young Women (Salt Lake City: Deseret Book)
Archival materials relating to Bertha S. Reeder L. Tom Perry Special Collections, Harold B. Lee Library, Brigham Young University

1892 births
1982 deaths
American Mormon missionaries in the United States
General Presidents of the Young Women (organization)
Mission presidents (LDS Church)
People from Ogden, Utah
Female Mormon missionaries
20th-century Mormon missionaries
American leaders of the Church of Jesus Christ of Latter-day Saints
Latter Day Saints from Massachusetts
Latter Day Saints from Utah
Latter Day Saints from Idaho